Anil Kumar is an Indian politician, Member of Bihar Legislative Assembly from Tekari constituency and a former Minister of State in the Government of Bihar.He is also the National Vice President of HAM (Secular) party headed by Shri Jitan Ram Manjhi, former Chief Minister of Bihar. He has represented Tekari assembly from 2005 to 2015 in JDU. He has also won from LJP ticket in 2005 February state election. Assembly was dissolved during the period and a group was formed named break away LJP under the leadership of Narendra Singh state president of LJP.

He sought re-election with JDU ticket in 2005 November from Tekari assembly Constituency.

Kumar won fourth time in 2020 assembly election by defeating his nearest rival from Congress Party. It was a closely fought election in which he defeated his nearest rival by 2800 votes.  Dr Anil Kumar is also the national vice president for HAM( Secular) party headed by Shri Jitan Ram Manjhi.

Kumar fought his first election in the year 1990 from Makhdumpur constituency which is now a reserved constituency in Jehanabad. He secured the ticket from Janta Dal where he was defeated by his nearest rival Shri Ram Jatan Sinha from Congress Party. He held several positions in RJD before moving with Lok Janshakti Party. Dr Anil Kumar was very close to Shri Ram Vilas Paswan and was made National General Secretary for the Party.

Kumar is known for his huge developments works done in Tekari constituency in Gaya district and also for opening prestigious institution like Indian Institute of Technology Patna and Birla Institute of Technology Patna while he was serving as Science and Technology Minister for Bihar.

Kumar's brother, Arun Kumar is a former Member of Parliament from Jehanabad and is also the National President of a newly formed political outfit Bhartiya Sablog Party.

References 

Living people
Lok Janshakti Party politicians
Janata Dal (United) politicians
Hindustani Awam Morcha politicians
1960 births
Janata Dal politicians